Croatian passport is issued to citizens of the Republic of Croatia for the purpose of international travel. The passport has the purpose of serving as proof of Croatian citizenship and identity. Responsibility for their issuance lies with the Ministry of the Interior; and for citizens abroad, passports are issued by the local embassy or consulate. Croatian passports are valid for ten or five years, and are not renewable. Every Croatian citizen is also a citizen of the European Union. The passport, along with the national identity card allows for free rights of movement and residence in any of the states of the European Economic Area and Switzerland.

Croatia started issuing biometric passports on 1 July 2009.

Physical appearance
Croatian passports are dark blue, with the Croatian coat of arms emblazoned in the centre of the front cover. The passport contains 34 pages.

The third generation Croatian passport has been changed in design due to the recent accession into the European Union. From 3 August 2015, the new Croatian passport retained its dark blue cover and is the odd one out among the 27 European Union member states' passports and the words  (European Union in Croatian) have been printed on it as per EU regulations. Additionally, the new cover is only in Croatian; the English and French have been removed.

Languages
The data page/information page is printed in Croatian, English and French.

Data pages
From 2009, each biometric passport has a data page and a residence page. A data page has a visual zone and a machine-readable zone. The visual zone has a digitised photograph of the passport holder, data about the passport, and data about the passport holder:

Page No.2:
 Photograph
 Type of document, which is "P" for "passport"
 Code of the issuing country, which is "HRV" for "Croatia"
 Passport number
 Surname
 Given names
 Nationality, which is "Hrvatsko" ("Croatian")
 Date of birth
 Sex
 Place of birth
 Date of issue
 Date of expiration
 Issuing authority
 Signature

Page No.3:
 Personal identification number

History

Croatian Passports were first issued by the Kingdom of Croatia-Slavonia-Dalmatia under Austria-Hungary. They were written in Croatian and French and had the coat of arms of the Kingdom of Croatia-Slavonia-Dalmatia on the cover.
(Reference: Antun Radić, "Hrvatski pašuši (putnice)" Dom, 15 January 1903, page 11)

The first modern Croatian passports were issued from 26 June 1991, after Croatia declared its independence from Yugoslavia. The old Yugoslav passports were valid until 25 June 1992. Since then, three types of Croatian passports have been issued, all machine-readable and with blue covers.

The first series was issued from 1991, until the end of 1999. It was distinguished by a thick paper cover and by a photo which had been laminated inside the document. This passport was printed by a local police station in the town of residence, or by the local embassy or consulate if living abroad. This series was in circulation until 31 December 2009, when the last ten-year passport issued expired.

At the end of 1999, the Croatian Government introduced the new passport. New security features similar to those on banknotes have been added with increasing frequency since January 2000. Microprinting, holographic images, UV-visible imaging, watermarks and other details have been implemented, particularly on the photo page. As well, the photo is now digitally printed directly on the paper (in both standard and UV-reactive ink). The new passports were issued in the same way as the old ones, with a difference in printing process. All passports are printed in Zagreb, with the issuing wait time up to 30 days. They have been issued since 1 January 2000.

Biometric passport
From 30 June 2009, the government started issuing new biometric passports in Zagreb. Other local police stations started issuing biometric passports on 18 January 2010. The embassies or consulates will issue biometric passport from 30 June 2010. Non-biometric passports will remain valid until its stated date of expiry.

Croatia was the third country in Europe that started issuing second-generation biometric passports. The chip contains two fingerprints and a digital image of the passport holder.

Types of passports

 Regular Passport – Blue colour, valid for five or ten years.
 Diplomatic and Official Passport – For Croatian diplomats, their spouses and children. It is valid for five years.
 Traveling Certificate, Laissez Passer or Putni List  – Travel certificate is a travel document issued by the Croatian diplomatic mission or consular office to Croatian citizen who resides or is found abroad without travel documents to return to Croatia. The same travel certificate may be used by the spouse and children's, the travel certificate is valid for 30 days.

Visa free travel

Visa requirements for Croatian citizens are administrative entry restrictions by the authorities of other states placed on citizens of Croatia. As of 13th October 2020, Croatian citizens had visa-free or visa on arrival access to 171 countries and territories, ranking the Croatian passport 17th in the world (tied with Bulgaria), according to the Henley Passport Index.

International travel using ID card

Croatia finished negotiating their accession to the European Economic Area in November 2013. Since then, the Croatian identity card has been a valid travel document within all of Europe (except Belarus, Russia, Ukraine and United Kingdom) as well as French overseas territories and Georgia.

Validity in these countries (except Albania, Bosnia and Herzegovina, Georgia, North Macedonia, Moldova, Montenegro, North Cyprus and Serbia) is based on the membership of the European Union and the implementation of the "European Agreement on Regulations governing the Movement of Persons between Member States of the Council of Europe".

Gallery of historic passports

See also

Passports of the European Union
List of passports
Visa requirements for Croatian citizens
Visa policy of the Schengen Area
Foreign relations of Croatia
List of diplomatic missions of Croatia

References

External links

Passport law 
Visa requirements overview

Passports by country
Passport
Passport
European Union passports